The Port Olímpic is a marina located in Barcelona, Catalonia. Located east of the Port of Barcelona, it hosted the sailing events for the 1992 Summer Olympics.
It will also be the main venue for the 2024 Americas Cup. The venue was opened in 1991.

Gallery

References

1992 Summer Olympics official report. Volume 2. pp. 255–8.
Port de Barcelona/El Port/Portada Official website. 

Buildings and structures completed in 1991
Venues of the 1992 Summer Olympics
Olympic sailing venues
Sports venues in Barcelona
Ports and harbours of Catalonia
Marinas in Spain
Buildings and structures in Barcelona
1991 establishments in Spain